The Guangdong Olympic Tennis Centre (now known as the Aoti Tennis Centre due to naming rights) is a tennis centre located in Guangzhou, China. It has 13 outdoor tennis courts and can seat 9,534 spectators in its main competition stadium and accommodate 1,845 in a subsidiary hall. It hosted the tennis event at the 2010 Asian Games. It has been the home of Guangzhou International Women's Open from 2015 to 2018.

See also
 Sports in China

External links
Venue information

Tennis venues in China
Sports venues in Guangzhou
Venues of the 2010 Asian Games